Kuznetsky District is the name of several administrative and municipal districts in Russia.

Districts of the federal subjects

Kuznetsky District, Penza Oblast, an administrative and municipal district of Penza Oblast

City divisions
Kuznetsky City District, a city district of Novokuznetsk, a city in Kemerovo Oblast

See also
Kuznetsky (disambiguation)

References